Mihai Galiceanu (born 27 September 1982) is a Romanian cross-country skier. He competed in the men's sprint event at the 2006 Winter Olympics.

References

1982 births
Living people
Romanian male cross-country skiers
Olympic cross-country skiers of Romania
Cross-country skiers at the 2006 Winter Olympics
Sportspeople from Reșița